is a Japanese manga series written and illustrated by Sanami Matoh.

Plot
Marlo, a teenage half-vampire, half-werewolf, discovers that during the full moon, he turns into a girl.  His family betroth him to the playboy vampire and son of a family friend, David.

Sequel
In 2008 a sequel to the 1998 series was released that focused on the married life of Marlo and David.

Publication history
Originally serialized in Be Boy Comics, the individual chapters were collected and published in a single tankōbon volume by Biblos in 1998. In February 2005, Until the Full Moon was translated to English and published in North America by Broccoli Books. The license for the company eventually lapsed and the manga license was picked up by Kodansha USA for a 2011 release of both volumes as well as the sequel.

References

External links

Anime Boredom review
Mania.com review of volume 1 (volume 2)
Salek, Rebecca (June 2005) More Than Just Mommy and Daddy: "Nontraditional" Families in Comics Sequential Tart

Yaoi anime and manga
Manga series